Ban Pin railway station is a railway station in Ban Pin Sub-district, Long District, Phrae Province, Thailand. It is a class 2 railway station 563.865 km from Bangkok railway station. It is on the Northern Line of the State Railway of Thailand. The station opened in June 1914, following the Northern Line extension from Huai Mae Ta to Ban Pin. The line continued to Pha Khan in 1915.

The station's design and construction is that of a Bavarian timber frame building, a product of the German engineers who worked on building the Northern Line. It is the only railway station in Thailand in the Bavarian style.

Train services
 Special Express 7/8 Bangkok-Chiang Mai-Bangkok
 Special Express 13/14 Bangkok-Chiang Mai-Bangkok
 Express 51/52 Bangkok-Chiang Mai-Bangkok
 Rapid 102 Chiang Mai-Bangkok
 Rapid 109 Bangkok-Chiang Mai
 Local 407/408 Nakhon Sawan-Chiang Mai-Nakhon Sawan

References

Further reading 
 Ichirō, Kakizaki (2010). Ōkoku no tetsuro: tai tetsudō no rekishi. Kyōto: Kyōtodaigakugakujutsushuppankai. 
 Otohiro, Watanabe (2013). Tai kokutetsu yonsenkiro no tabi: shasō fūkei kanzen kiroku. Tōkyō: Bungeisha. 

Railway stations in Thailand
Railway stations opened in 1914